Nestor Ivanovych Makhno ( 1888 – 25 July 1934), also known as Bat'ko Makhno ("Father Makhno"), was a Ukrainian anarchist revolutionary and the commander of the Revolutionary Insurgent Army of Ukraine during the Ukrainian Civil War.

Makhno was the namesake  of the Makhnovshchina (loosely translated as "Makhno movement"), a predominantly peasant phenomenon that grew into a mass social movement. It was initially centered around Makhno's hometown Huliaipole but over the course of the Ukrainian Civil War came to exert a strong influence over large areas of southern Ukraine. Makhno and the majority of the movement's leadership were anarcho-communists and attempted to guide the movement along these ideological lines. Makhno was aggressively opposed to all factions that sought to impose their authority over southern Ukraine, battling in succession the forces of the Ukrainian People's Republic, Central Powers, White Army, Red Army, and other smaller forces led by various Ukrainian otamans. Makhno and his supporters attempted to reorganize social and economic life along anarchist lines, including the establishment of communes on former landed estates, the requisition and egalitarian redistribution of land to the peasants, and the organization of free elections to local soviets (councils) and regional congresses. However, the disruption of the civil war precluded a stable territorial base for any long-term social experiments.

Although Makhno considered the Bolsheviks a threat to the development of anarchism in Ukraine, he entered into formal military alliances twice with the Red Army to defeat the White Army. In the aftermath of the White Army's defeat in Crimea in November 1920, the Bolsheviks initiated a military campaign against Makhno. After an extended period of open resistance against the Red Army, Makhno fled across the Romanian border in August 1921. In exile, Makhno settled in Paris with his wife Halyna and daughter Elena. During this period, Makhno wrote numerous memoirs and articles for radical newspapers. Makhno also played an important role in the development of platformism and the debates around the 1926 Organizational Platform of the General Union of Anarchists (Draft). Makhno died in 1934 in Paris at the age of 45 from tuberculosis-related causes.

Early life
On , Nestor Makhno was born into a poor peasant family in Huliaipole, a town in the Katerynoslav Governorate of the Russian Empire (now Zaporizhzhia Oblast, Ukraine). He was the youngest of five children born to Ivan and Evdokia Mikhnenko, former serfs who had been emancipated in 1861.

Unable to feed his family on their small plot of land, following Nestor's birth, Ivan Mikhnenko went to work as a coachman for a wealthy industrialist. When Nestor was only ten months old, his father died, leaving behind an impoverished family. Nestor was briefly fostered by a more well-off peasant couple, but he was unhappy with them and returned to his family of birth. At only seven years old, the young Nestor was put to work tending livestock. When he turned eight years old, he began his education in a local secular school as a model student before becoming increasingly truant, often ditching school to play games and go ice skating. After the end of his first school year, he went to work on a Mennonite-owned estate near Huliaipole, bringing home 20 rubles over the course of the summer. His brothers also worked as farmhands to support the family.

After the summer, Nestor returned to school, but his second school year proved to be his last. His family's extreme poverty forced the ten-year-old Nestor to begin working in the fields full-time, which led him to develop a "sort of rage, resentment, even hatred for the wealthy property-owner". Nestor's aversion to the landlords only increased over time, nurtured by stories his mother told him of her time in serfdom. In the summer of 1902, when Nestor was twelve, he observed a farm manager and the landlord's sons physically beating a young farmhand. He quickly alerted an older stable hand "Batko Ivan", who attacked the assailants and led a spontaneous workers' revolt against the landlord. After the affair was settled, Ivan told Nestor: "if one of your masters should ever strike you, pick up the first pitchfork you lay hands on and let him have it..." The following year, Nestor quit working in the fields and found a job in a foundry. At this time, his older brothers had left home and started their own families, leaving only the young Nestor and Hryhorii with their mother. Nestor rapidly moved between jobs, focusing most of his work on his mother's land, while occasionally returning to employment to help provide for his brothers.

Revolutionary activity 

When the 1905 revolution broke out, the sixteen-year-old Makhno quickly joined the revolutionary fervor. He initially distributed propaganda for the Social Democratic Labor Party, before affiliating with his home town's local anarcho-communist group: the Union of Poor Peasants. Despite the political climate of increased political repression against revolutionaries, the Union continued to meet weekly and inspired Makhno to devote himself to the revolution. Makhno was initially distrusted by other members of the group, due to his apparent penchant for drinking and getting into fights. But after six months in the Union of Poor Peasants, Makhno had thoroughly educated himself on the principles of libertarian communism and became a formal member. 

Following a series of agrarian reforms, which disempowered the traditional peasant communes through the creation of a wealthier land-owning class and resulted in the growth of private estates, the Union of Poor Peasants initiated a campaign of "Black Terror" against the large landowners and the local Tsarist police. The group carried out a series of expropriations against local businessmen, using the money they stole to print propaganda that attacked the recent reforms. Suspected of being involved in these attacks, Makhno was arrested in September 1907 but was eventually released without charges due to a lack of evidence. As the rest of the group's members had been outlawed, Makhno founded another anarchist study group in a neighboring village, where two dozen members gathered on a weekly basis to discuss anarchist theory. But after the assassination of a police informant by the Union of Poor Peasants, the police launched a crackdown against the anarchist group and arrested many of its members, including Makhno himself in August 1909.

Imprisonment

On 26 March 1910 a district court-martial convened in Katerynoslav sentenced Makhno to be hanged. Although he had refused to seek appeal, Makhno's sentence was commuted to a life sentence of hard labor, due to his young age. While in prison, Makhno contracted a near-fatal bout of typhoid fever, but he eventually recovered and returned to work in chains. He was then moved to the prison in Luhansk, where family briefly visited him, before being moved again to the prison in Katerynoslav. In August 1911, he was transferred one final time: to Butyrka prison in Moscow, where over 3,000 political prisoners were being held. Through the other prisoners he learned Russian history and political theory, taking a particular interest in Mutual Aid: A Factor of Evolution (1902) by Peter Kropotkin. Makhno's frequent boasting in prison earned him the nickname "Modest". He sometimes even antagonized the guards, which landed him in solitary confinement. Due to punishment-cell conditions, Makhno quickly fell sick again and was diagnosed with tuberculosis. The disease kept him returning to the prison hospital throughout his sentence.

In Butyrka prison Makhno met the anarcho-communist politician Peter Arshinov, who took the young anarchist under his wing as a student. But during this time, Makhno also became disillusioned with intellectualism after seeing the differences between how the prison guards treated the intellectual prisoners and those inmates from the lower classes. As the years passed, Makhno began to write his own works and to distribute them among his fellow-prisoners, starting off with a poem titled Summons that called for a libertarian communist revolution. Prison did not break his revolutionary zeal, with Makhno vowing that he would "contribute to the free re-birth of his country". Although exposed to the ideas of Ukrainian nationalism in prison, Makhno nevertheless remained hostile to all forms of nationalism, adopting an  internationalist position during World War I and even circulating an anti-war petition around the prison. When the prison doors were flung open during the February Revolution of 1917, Makhno was released from bondage for the first time in eight years, even finding himself off-balance without the chains weighing him down and in need of sunglasses after years in dark prison cells. He remained in Moscow for three weeks, briefly getting involved with an anarchist group in Moscow's Lefortovo District until 23 March, when his mother and old comrades from the anarcho-communist group finally convinced him to return to Huliaipole.

Agrarian activism

Following years of imprisonment, in March 1917, the 28-year-old Makhno finally returned to Huliaipole, where he was reunited with his mother and elder brothers. At the station, he was greeted by many of the town's peasants, who were curious to see the return of the famous political exile, as well as surviving members from the now-defunct Union of Poor Peasants. Clashing with many of the group's former members, who wanted to focus on propaganda, Makhno proposed that libertarians take clear leadership of the masses in order to ignite mass action among the peasantry, but found his position a minority among the anarchists of Huliaipole. He instead led the establishment of a local Peasants' Union on 29 March and was elected as its chairman. The union quickly came to represent the majority of Huliaipole's peasantry and even those from the surrounding region. Carpenters and metalworkers also formed their own industrial unions and elected Makhno as their chairman. By April, Huliaipole's Public Committee, the local organ of the Provisional Government, had been brought under the control of the town's peasantry and anarcho-communist activists. It was during this period of rising anarchist activity in Huliaipole that Makhno met Nastia Vasetskaia, who would become his first wife, but his activism kept him too busy to focus on his marriage.

Makhno quickly became a leading figure in Huliaipole's revolutionary movement, aiming to sideline any political parties that sought to seize control of the workers' organizations. He justified his leadership as only a temporary responsibility. As a union leader, Makhno led workers in strike actions against their employers, demanding wages be doubled and vowing the continuation of work stoppages in case of their refusal, eventually resulting in the establishment of workers' control over all industry in Huliaipole. As Huliaipole's delegate to the regional peasant congress in Oleksandrivsk, he called for the expropriation of large estates from landowners and their transfer to communal ownership by the peasants that worked them, becoming infamous throughout the region. However, he quickly became disillusioned with the long debates and party politics that dominated the congress, considering Huliaipole to have "advanced beyond what the congresses were merely talking about, without the constant wrangling and jockeying for position." Makhno subsequently disarmed and minimized the powers of local law enforcement prior to seizing property from local landlords and equally redistributing the lands to the peasantry, in open defiance of the Russian Provisional Government and its officials in Oleksandrivsk. All this gave him an image of social banditry, as local peasants compared him to the Cossack rebel leaders Stenka Razin and Yemelyan Pugachev, and rallied around the slogan of "Land and Liberty". 

Although he had achieved success at home, Makhno was disappointed to discover general disorganization among the wider anarchist movement, which he criticized for largely dedicating itself to propaganda activities. Despite its growing size, the anarchist movement found itself unable to compete with the established political parties, as it had yet to establish a coordinated organization capable of playing a leading role in the revolutionary movement. Following news of Lavr Kornilov's attempted coup against the Provisional Government, Makhno led the establishment of a "Committee for the Defense of the Revolution" in Huliaipole, which organized armed peasant detachments against the local landlords, bourgeoisie, and kulaks. Makhno called for the local bourgeoisie to be disarmed and their property expropriated, with all private enterprise to be brought under workers' control. Peasants withheld rent and took control of the lands they worked. Large estates collectivized and transformed into agrarian communes. Makhno personally organized communes on former Mennonite estates. Makhno and Nastia lived together on a commune and Makhno himself worked two days per week, helping with the farming and occasionally fixing machines. 

Following the 1917 October Revolution, Makhno bore witness to the rising hostilities between the Ukrainian nationalists and the Bolsheviks. With the outbreak of the Soviet–Ukrainian War, Makhno advised anarchists to take up arms alongside the Red Guards against the forces of the Ukrainian nationalists and the White movement. Makhno dispatched his brother Savelii to Oleksandrivsk at the head of an armed anarchist detachment to assist the Bolsheviks in retaking the city from the Nationalists. The city was taken and Makhno was chosen as the anarchists' representative to the Oleksandrivsk Revolutionary Committee. He was also elected chairman of a commission, which reviewed the cases of accused counter-revolutionary military prisoners, and oversaw the release of still imprisoned workers and peasants. During this period Makhno, participated in Oleksandrivsk's successful defence against an assault by Don and Kuban Cossacks. Makhno thereafter returned to Huliaipole, where he organized the town bank's expropriation to fund their revolutionary activities.

Journey to Moscow

On 9 February 1918, representatives from the Ukrainian People's Republic signed a peace treaty with the Central Powers, inviting the forces of the German Empire and Austria-Hungary to invade and occupy Ukraine. In response, Makhno formed a volunteer detachment to resist the occupation, which was dispatched to join the Red Guards in Oleksandrivsk. Makhno was personally summoned to the train of Bolshevik Commander Alexander Yegorov, but failed to link up with Yegorov who was in fast retreat. In Makhno's absence, Ukrainian nationalists seized control of Huliaipole and invited forces from the Austro-Hungarian Army to occupy the town in April 1918. Unable to return home, Makhno retreated to Taganrog, where a conference of Huliaipole's exiled anarchists was held. Makhno left to rally Russian support for the Ukrainian anarchist cause with plans to retake Huliaipole in July 1918. In early May, Makhno visited Rostov-on-Don, Tikhoretsk, and Tsaritsyn, where he was briefly reunited with Nastia and a number of his Huliaipole comrades.

On his travels, Makhno witnessed the newly established Cheka confront, disarm, and kill revolutionary partisans who disobeyed their decrees, causing Makhno to question whether "institutional revolutionaries" would extinguish the revolution. In Astrakhan, Makhno found himself working for the local soviet's propaganda department and giving speeches to Red soldiers bound for the front. While travelling by rail to Moscow near the end of May, Makhno made use of the armored train's artillery to disentangle it from the advance of the Don Cossacks, who had been pursuing Red Guards in Makhno's company. 

After spending a few days in the Volga region, Makhno finally arrived in Moscow, which he pejoratively dubbed "the capital of the paper revolution", where he found local anarchist intellectuals more predisposed to slogans and manifestos than action. Here he again made contact with Peter Arshinov and others in the Muscovite anarchist movement, many of whom were under surveillance by the Bolshevik authorities. He also met the Left Socialist-Revolutionaries, who at this time were beginning to turn against the Bolsheviks. Makhno discussed Ukraine with the anarcho-communist theorist Peter Kropotkin, who wished Makhno well.

Satisfied with his time in Moscow and in need of forged identity papers to cross the Ukrainian border, Makhno applied to the Kremlin. Yakov Sverdlov immediately arranged for Makhno to meet Vladimir Lenin. Lenin showered Makhno with questions about Ukraine, which Makhno answered, even as Lenin bemoaned that the country's peasantry had been "contaminated by anarchism". Makhno staunchly defended the Ukrainian anarchist movement from charges of "counter-revolution", criticizing the Red Guards for sticking to the railways while peasant partisans fought on the front lines. Lenin expressed his admiration for Makhno and admitted his mistakes regarding the revolutionary conditions in Ukraine, where anarchists had already become the predominant revolutionary force. After a long conversation, Lenin passed Makhno on to Volodymyr Zatonsky, who fulfilled his request for a false passport. The young Ukrainian finally departed for the border in late June, content that he had "take[n] the temperature of the revolution".

Leader of the Makhnovist movement

During Makhno's absence from Ukraine, the Austro-German occupation forces orchestrated a coup in late April 1918 against their former allies within the Ukrainian People's Republic, removing the UPR's Central Council and installing Pavlo Skoropadskyi as Hetman of a new conservative client state.

Armed with a fake passport and disguised as a Ukrainian officer, Makhno crossed the Ukrainian border in July 1918. He learned that the forces occupying Huliaipole had shot, tortured, and arrested many of the town's revolutionaries. His brother Savelii had been arrested, and his brother Omelian, a disabled war veteran, executed. Their mother's house was also destroyed by the occupation forces. Nestor himself was forced to take a number of precautions to evade capture. To avoid recognition while aboard the crowded train carriages, he changed at Kharkiv and Synelnykove, and ultimately decided to walk the final 27 kilometers to Rozhdestvenskoye after his train was searched by police. Through correspondence, Makhno's comrades in Huliaipole discouraged him from returning, fearing he would be caught by the authorities.

After weeks in hiding, Makhno clandestinely returned to Huliaipole. In a number of secret meetings, he began to lay plans for an insurrection and started to organize peasant partisans. He advocated for coordinated attacks on the estates of large landowners, advised against individual acts of terrorism, and forbade anti-semitic pogroms. From the outset, Makhno emphasized tactical and theoretical unity, patiently awaiting favorable conditions for a general insurrection. 

The authorities discovered Makhno's presence and placed a bounty on his head. Makhno retreated from Huliaipole, narrowly escaping capture. In Ternivka, Makhno revealed himself to the local population and established a peasant detachment to lead attacks against the occupation and Hetmanate government. In coordination with partisans in Rozhdestvenskoye Makhno resolved to reoccupy Huliaipole and establish it as a permanent headquarters for the insurgent movement. He raided multiple Austrian positions, seizing weapons and money, which led to the insurrection's intensification in the region. . While disguised as a woman, Makhno even briefly returned to Huliaipole, where he planned to blow up the local command center of the occupation forces. According to Makhno's account, he called off the attack due to the risks of killing innocent civilians.

In September 1918, Makhno briefly reoccupied Huliaipole. There he discovered that the German occupation forces had been spreading misinformation about him, claiming he had robbed the local peasantry and ran away with the money to buy a dacha in Moscow. After defeating Austrian units in nearby Marfopil, Makhno produced a letter that was translated into the German language, encouraging the conscripted occupation troops to mutiny, return home and launch revolutions of their own. While his comrades scattered themselves throughout the region to rouse the peasants to revolt, Makhno prepared proclamations to announce the region was under insurgent control. However, when the occupation forces counterattacked, Makhno was forced evacuate Huliaipole.

Makhno's detachment withdrew north, where it sought refuge in the Dibrivka forest, neighbouring the village of Velykomykhailivka. There they joined forces with another small insurgent detachment led by Fedir Shchus. Austrian units encircled the insurgents in their forest encampment. To break the encirclement, Makhno launched a surprise counterattack against the troops in the village. Led by Makhno and Shchus, the insurgents' gamble succeeded in forcing the Austrians into retreat. For his role in their victory, the insurgents bestowed Makhno with the title Bat'ko, which remained his moniker throughout the remainder of the war.

Makhno's victory in the battle of Dibrivka provoked a vicious retaliation from the occupation forces. Velykomykhailovka was subsequently attacked by Austrian troops reinforced by National Guard and German colonist units. The village was set on fire, killing many inhabitants and destroying some 600 houses. Makhno, in turn, led a campaign of retributive attacks against the occupation forces and their collaborators, including much of the region's Mennonite population. Makhno also focused much of his energies on agitating amongst the peasantry, gathering much support in the region through impassioned improptu village speeches against his enemies. 

By November 1918, the insurgents definitively recaptured Huliaipole. At a regional insurgent conference, Makhno proposed that they open up a war on four simultaneous fronts against the Hetmanate, Central Powers, Don Cossacks, and nascent White movement. He argued that in order to prosecute such a conflict, it would be necessary to reorganize an insurgent army along a federal model, directly answerable to him as commander-in-chief.

Commander in the Red Army

The Central Powers' defeat in World War I saw their withdrawal from Ukraine, resulting in the overthrow of the Hetmanate government by the Directorate, which established a new nationalist government in Kyiv under the leadership of Symon Petliura. At the same time, the Bolsheviks invaded Ukraine from the north, while the Makhnovshchina faced pressure from a growing White Army in the south. Caught between these forces, Makhno proposed an alliance with the Red Army.

During a joint Insurgent-Bolshevik attack against the nationalist-held city of Katerynoslav, Makhno was appointed as commander-in-chief of the combined Soviet forces in the Katerynoslav province. After capturing the city, Makhno oversaw the establishment of a revolutionary committee equally representing Bolsheviks, SRs, and anarchists. When a nationalist counteroffensive forced Makhno to retreat to Huliaipole, he undertook a complete reorganization of insurgent forces on every front. On 26 January 1919, this process culminated in the integration of Makhnovist units into the Ukrainian Soviet Army as the 3rd Trans-Dnieper Brigade, with Makhno subordinate himself to the command of Pavel Dybenko. On 12 February 1919, Makhno extricated himself from the front to attend the movement's second regional congress in Huliaipole, where he was elected honorary chairman, having rejected official chairmanship due to the front requiring his attention. At the congress, he declared his support for "non-party soviets", in open defiance of his Bolshevik commanders.

Makhno justified the integration of the insurgent forces into the Red Army as a matter of placing the "revolution's interests above ideological differences." He was, nevertheless, open about his contempt for the new order of political commissars. The Bolshevik interference in front-line operations even led to Makhno arresting a Cheka detachment, which had directly obstructed his command. Despite his hostility towards the Bolsheviks, Makhno still respected freedom of the press, authorizing Bolshevik newspapers to be distributed in Huliaipole, Berdiansk, and Mariupol, even as the papers published denunciations of the Makhnovists. 

By April 1919, the newspaper Pravda was publishing glowing reports of Makhno's activities, praising him for his opposition to Ukrainian nationalism, his successful assault against Katerynoslav, and his continued successes against the White movement. These reports also detailed Makhno's widespread support amongst the Ukrainian peasantry. However, this did not stop Pavel Dybenko from declaring the insurgents' subsequent regional congresses to be "counter-revolutionary." Its participants were outlawed and Makhno was ordered to prevent future congresses from taking place. The Makhnovist Military Revolutionary Council issued an excoriating reply to Dybenko rejecting his demands out of hand.

To resolve the dispute, Makhno invited Vladimir Antonov-Ovseenko to visit Huliaipole, which impressed the Ukrainian commander-in-chief and allayed his concerns about Makhno's command. Upon his return, Antonov-Ovseenko openly praised Makhno and the insurgents, criticizing the Bolshevik press for publishing misinformation about Makhno and requesting the Makhnovists be supplied with the necessary equipment. His reports quickly attracted Lev Kamenev to himself visit Huliaipole the very next week. Kamenev too was greeted by Makhno and his new wife Halyna Kuzmenko, who gave the Bolshevik functionary a tour of the town, making sure to show off a tree where Makhno had personally lynched a White army officer. Despite disagreements between the two over the autonomy of the insurgent movement, Kamenev bade farewell to Makhno with an embrace and warm words. Kamenev immediately published an open letter to Makhno, praising him as an "honest and courageous fighter" in the war against the White movement. 

In May 1919, the powerful otaman Nykyfor Hryhoriv revolted against the Bolsheviks, seizing part of Kherson province. Kamenev sent a telegram to Makhno, asking him to condemn Hryhoriv or else face a declaration of war. Hryhoriv had previously attempted to form an alliance with Makhno against the Bolsheviks, but this proposal went unanswered. Makhno responded to Kamenev's request by reaffirming his commitment to the struggle against the White movement, which he worried would be endangered by opening conflict with Hryhoriv. In a direct telegram to Kamenev, Makhno declared his loyalty to the revolution, while also stating that he would continue to oppose the actions of the Cheka and any other "organs of oppression and violence". In an insurgent military congress on 12 May, Makhno expanded on this anti-authoritarian position with a denunciation of the Bolsheviks, their implementation of bureaucratic collectivism, and their political repression, which he compared to the Tsarist autocracy. After Makhnovist emissaries uncovered evidence of Hryhoriv's participation in pogroms, Makhno openly denounced him for his displays of antisemitism and Ukrainian nationalism, going on to blame the Bolsheviks for the rise of Hryhoriv, claiming it was their political repression that had caused the uprising.

The Red Army high command responded by attempting to rein in Makhno's influence over his detachment. Makhno's Red Army superior Commander  even declared that "he is to be liquidated". By the end of May 1919, the Bolshevik Revolutionary Military Council pronounced Makhno to be an outlaw, issuing a warrant for his arrest and for him to be tried before a revolutionary tribunal. On 2 June, Leon Trotsky published a diatribe against Makhno, attacking him for his anarchist ideology and even labeling him a "kulak".

A few days later, while preoccupied at the front, Makhno learned that the Kuban Cossacks had captured Huliaipole. This forced him to retreat from his positions. In an attempt to appease Trotsky, Makhno resigned his command of the insurgent army so that the insurgents would not be caught in a pincer between the Red and White armies. Despite a rebuff from Trotsky, he again attempted to offer the Bolsheviks his resignation on 9 June, reaffirming his commitment to the Revolution and his belief in the "inalienable right of workers and peasants". Makhno thus relinquished command of the 7th Ukrainian Soviet Division and declared his intention to wage a guerrilla war against the Whites from the rear. Trotsky then ordered Kliment Voroshilov to arrest Makhno, but sympathetic officers reported the order to him, thus preventing his capture by the Cheka. Despite having broken with the Red Army, Makhno still considered the White movement to be the Makhnovists' "main enemy" and insisted that they could settle their scores with Bolsheviks after the Whites were defeated.

Makhno's small sotnia then linked up with other insurgent detachments that had mutinied against the Red Army. In early July 1919, Makhno fell back into Kherson province, where he met with Hryhoriv's green army. Initially Makhno sought to form a strategic alliance with the latter due to Hryhoriv's popularity among the local peasantry. However, revelations of Hryhoriv's antisemitism, extensive pogroms, and connections with the White movement led the Makhnovists to openly denounce the otaman at a public meeting. When Hryhoriv reached for his revolver, he was gunned down in his place by Oleksiy Chubenko. In the assassination's aftermath, Makhno quickly rebuilt his army. A portion of Hryhoriv's army was integrated into the Makhnovist forces, which numbered as high as 20,000 insurgents at this time. By August, Makhno was also attracting a large number of Red Army deserters who joined him as the Bolsheviks once again retreated from Ukrainian territory in the face of Anton Denikin's White Army. Red Army mutinies became so bad that the Ukrainian Bolshevik leader  even telephoned Makhno, begging him to  subordinate himself again to Bolshevik command, to which Makhno refused.

Against the White Army

By September 1919 the Bolsheviks had largely retreated from Ukraine, leaving the Makhnovists to face the White Army alone. Reports by the White commander Yakov Slashchov depicted Makhno as a formidable adversary with tactical ability and disciplinary command over his troops. The insurgents launched a number of effective attacks behind White lines, with Makhno himself commanding a cavalry assault against Mykolaivka that resulted in the capture of sorely needed munitions. Nestor's brother Hryhorii died during one of these attacks.

The White offensive eventually pushed the insurgents back as far as Uman, the last stronghold of the Ukrainian People's Republic, where Makhno negotiated a temporary truce with Symon Petliura, in order for wounded insurgents to recuperate on neutral ground before launching a counteroffensive. During the Battle of Perehonivka, the tide of the battle turned in the insurgents' favor when Makhno led his sotnia in a flanking maneuver against the White positions, charging the much larger enemy force with sabres and fighting them in close quarters combat, which forced the Whites into a retreat. Makhno then led the pursuit of the retreating Whites, decisively routing the enemy forces, leaving only a few hundred survivors. The Makhnovists subsequently split up in order to capitalize on their victory and capture as much territory as possible, with Makhno himself leading his sotnia in the capture of Katerynoslav from the Whites on 20 October. With southern Ukraine being brought almost entirely under insurgent control, the White supply lines were broken and the advance on Moscow was halted. The insurgent advance also brought with it attacks against region's Mennonites, notably including the Eichenfeld massacre. While Mennonite historiography has held Makhno himself directly responsible for the massacres, as commander-in-chief of the perpetrating forces, and Makhnovist historiography has attributed the violence to class conflict, research by Sean Patterson has indicated that the attacks were the result of deeply-held resentments between the native Ukrainians and Mennonite colonists.

Bolsheviks in Katerynoslav attempted to establish a revolutionary committee to control the city, proposing to Makhno that he confine himself exclusively to military activity. But Makhno no longer held any sympathy for the Bolsheviks, who he described as "parasites upon the workers' lives". He quickly ordered the revolutionary committee be shut down and forbade their activities under penalty of death, telling the Bolshevik officials to "take up a more honest trade". At a regional congress in Oleksandrivsk, Makhno presented the Draft Declaration of the Revolutionary Insurgent Army of Ukraine, which called for the establishment of "free soviets" outside of political party control. Mensheviks and Socialist Revolutionary Party delegates objected, believing instead in the legitimacy of the dissolved Constituent Assembly. Makhno denounced them as "counter-revolutionaries", causing them to walk out in protest. When he returned to Katerynoslav on 9 November, the local railway workers looked to Makhno to pay their wages, which they had gone without for two months. He responded by proposing the workers self-manage the railways and levy payment for their services directly from the customers. By December 1919, Makhnovist control of Katerynoslav began to slip under increasing attacks from the White Cossacks. On 5 December, Makhno survived an assassination attempt by the Bolsheviks, who had planned to poison him and seize control of the city. After the plot was uncovered, the conspirators were shot.

Renewed White attacks forced the Makhnovists to abandon Katerynoslav and retreat towards Oleksandrivsk and Nikopol. During this period, many of the insurgents were beset by epidemic typhus, with even Makhno himself contracting the disease. In January 1920, the Red Army returned to Ukraine, filling a power vacuum that had been left in the wake of the White retreat. Makhnovist and Red forces greeted each other in Oleksandrivsk. However, negotiations between the two sides collapsed when the Red command ordered Makhno to the Polish front. Makhno refused and the All-Ukrainian Central Executive Committee declared Makhno to be an outlaw. In response the Makhnovists fled to Huliaipole, initiating a nine-month period of hostilities with the Bolshevik. At this time, Makhno's typhus worsened and he slipped into prolonged coma, during which local peasants provided him refuge and hid him from the Cheka. Once recovered, Makhno immediately began to lead a campaign of guerrilla warfare against the Cheka and requisitioning units. 

Makhno also implemented a discriminatory policy for dealing with captured Red Army units: commanding officers and political commissars would be immediately shot, while the rank-and-file soldiers would be given the choice to either join the insurgent army or be stripped of their uniforms and sent home. With the Makhnovists once again wreaking havoc on Bolshevik positions and with Red Army soldiers increasingly defecting to the insurgents, proposals for an alliance between the two factions began to be made.

While initially skeptical of a proposed Bolshevik alliance in June, Makhno grew amenable and left the decision to his army, which narrowly voted in favor in August. The political agreement extended a number of freedoms to Ukrainian anarchists, while the military agreement again integrated the insurgents into the Red Army command structure. Despite the outcome of the Starobilsk agreement, Makhno reaffirmed his distrust for his "irreconcilable enemies" in the Bolshevik Party, stating that the necessity of a military alliance with them should not be confused with a recognition of their political authority. Nevertheless, Makhno hoped that victory over the Whites would oblige the Bolsheviks to honor his desire for soviet democracy and civil liberties in Ukraine. He would later consider this to be a "grave error" on his part. 

Under the terms of the pact, Makhno was finally able to seek treatment from the medical corps of the Red Army, with physicians and surgeons seeing to a wound in his ankle, where he had been hit by an expanding bullet. He was also visited by the Hungarian communist leader Béla Kun, who greeted him as "fighter of the worker and peasant revolution, comrade Batko Makhno" and gave him gifts, including over 100 photographs and postcards depicting the Executive Committee of the Communist International. On 22 October, the insurgents successfully reoccupied Huliaipole, driving the Whites out of the city for the final time. Back in his hometown, Makhno requested three days of rest and recuperation but this was rejected by the Bolshevik command, which ordered the insurgents to continue their offensive, under penalty of their alliance being nullified. The still-wounded Makhno stayed behind in Huliaipole anyway, along with his black guard, while dispatching Semen Karetnyk to lead the Makhnovist offensive against the Army of Wrangel. Makhno once again turned his attention towards reconstructing his vision of anarcho-communism, overseeing the reestablishment of the local soviet and a number of other anarchist projects.

Anti-Bolshevik rebellion

Wrangel's defeat in Crimea by the combined Bolshevik-Makhnovist forces brought the Southern Front of the war to an end, allowing the Bolsheviks to once again turn on their anarchist allies. In late November 1920, the Red Army launched a surprise attack against the insurgent forces, putting the Makhnovist capital of Huliaipole under siege. Caught unprepared, Makhno rallied together 150 Black Guards to defend the town. After spotting a gap in the Red lines, he escaped with his detachment and led a counterattack that pushed the Red forces back to Novouspenivka. His own forces regrouped and gained some defecting Red soldiers before recapturing Huliaipole a week later. The Red Army command justified the attacks against the Makhnovists on grounds that Makhno had refused orders and intended to betray them, though the Red Army had planned to break the alliance with the Makhnovists even prior to the beginning of the offensive against Wrangel's White Army.

The following week in Kermenchyk, Makhno was finally reunited with Karetnyk's detachment, which had been reduced to a fifth of its original size and absent its commander, who had been assassinated by the Bolsheviks in Crimea. Despite direct orders from Vladimir Lenin for the Red Army to "liquidate Makhno", the insurgents led a guerrilla campaign in the face of their encirclement. On 3 December, Makhno led a detachment of 4,000 insurgents in an assault routing a Red Kirghiz brigade at Komar. In the following weeks, he recaptured Berdiansk and Andriivka from the Bolsheviks, defeating a number of Red divisions before a stalemate with the remaining divisions at Fedorivka.

Makhno had hoped that simply defeating a few Red divisions would halt the offensive, but found himself having to change tactics in the face of his encirclement by overwhelming numbers, consequently splitting up his contingent into a number of smaller detachments and sending them in different directions. Taking his own 2,000-strong detachment north at a pace of 80 kilometers each day, he derailed a Bolshevik armored train at Oleksandrivsk, before pushing deep into the provinces of Kherson and Kyiv, all the while pursued by Red divisions. 

Surrounded and under constant pursuit by the Red Cossacks, Makhno's detachment could only advance slowly under heavy machine gun fire and artillery bombardment. Makhno led his detachment to the Galician border, before suddenly swinging around and heading back across the Dnieper. Heading north from Poltava to Belgorod, they finally managed to shake off the pursuing Cossacks at the end of January 1921. By this point he had travelled more than 1,500 kilometers, lost most of his equipment and half of his detachment, but he also found himself in a position to once again lead an offensive against the Red Army. Following the outbreak of the Kronstadt rebellion, Makhno dispatched a number of his detachments to various regions of Southern and Central Russia to foment insurrection, while he himself stuck to the banks of the Dnieper River. At this time, Makhno was wounded in the foot and had to be carried by a tachanka, but still managed to personally lead the detachment from the front. After crossing back over to left-bank Ukraine, he split his detachment again, sending one to stir up revolt against the Cheka near the Sea of Azov while Makhno's own contingent of 1,500 cavalry and two infantry regiments continued along its path, seizing the equipment of the Red units it routed. During one engagement, Makhno was wounded in the stomach and fell unconscious, having to be evacuated on a tachanka. Upon his resuscitation, he again divided his forces and sent them out in all directions, leaving himself behind with only his black sotnia remaining.

Makhno was unable to withdraw from the front and tend to his injuries, as his sotnia repeatedly came under attack by the Red Army. During one engagement, a number of Makhnovists sacrificed themselves to ensure Makhno's escape. Towards the end of May, Makhno attempted to organize a large-scale offensive to take the Ukrainian Bolshevik capital of Kharkiv, pulling together thousands of partisans before he was forced to call it off due to comprehensive Red defenses. The Red Army command resolved to focus its efforts on Makhno's small 200-strong sotnia, deploying a motorized detachment to pursue them. Upon its arrival, Makhno led the ambush of one armored car, taking it for himself and driving it until it ran out of fuel. The subsequent pursuit of Makhno lasted five days and covered 520 kilometers, causing his sotnia heavy losses and almost running them out of ammo, before they were finally able to shake the armored detachment off their trail.

Exile 
Red Army commander Mikhail Frunze demanded the "definitive liquidation" of the Makhnovist movement in July 1921. Makhno continued to execute raids in the Don river basin despite having suffered several wounds. By August, those wounds convinced him to seek treatment abroad. Leaving Viktor Bilash in command of the Insurgent Army, Makhno, his wife Halyna Kuzmenko, and around 100 loyalists set out for the Polish border. Red Army attacks followed them; Makhno took a bullet in the neck and a number of his old friends died in battle in late August. When a scout was captured by the Reds, Makhno diverted his forces south towards Romania, however, after crossing the Dniester, Romanian border guards disarmed and interned Makhno's group. Makhno and his wife were eventually released from the Brașov internment camp and granted permission to stay in Bucharest under police surveillance while Makhno recovered from his wounds.

Eastern Europe
Bolshevik politicians Georgy Chicherin and Christian Rakovsky demanded Makhno's extradition, which the Romanian government of Take Ionescu refused. The two states had no extradition treaty and Romania had abolished capital punishment, so the Romanian government requested a formal assurance that the Ukrainian Soviet government would not sentence Makhno to death. Makhno came into contact with the exiled Ukrainian nationalists around Symon Petliura, themselves allies of both Romania and Poland. Makhno called for an alliance between the Makhnovists and the Petliurists, which he believed could together reignite an insurgency in Ukraine, but nothing resulted from the talks between the two factions.

With Romania still caught up in the extradition demands, Makhno decided to make a break for Poland. He was caught at the border and shipped to a Polish Strzałkowo internment camp in April 1922. Makhno subsequently attempted to secure permission to move on to Czechoslovakia or Germany, but the Polish government refused. The Bolshevik government sent an agent provocateur to entrap Makhno and force his extradition by embroiling him in a plan to launch an insurgency in Galicia. Makhno and his wife were formally charged by the Polish authorities and for over a year held in pre-trial detention, where Halyna gave birth to their daughter in October. In prison, Makhno drafted his first memoir, which Peter Arshinov published in 1923 in his Berlin-based newspaper Anarkhicheskii vestnik (Russian: Анархический вестник; English: Anarchist Messenger) . Makhno also sent open letters to exiled Don Cossacks and the Ukrainian Communist Party, and began to learn German and Esperanto. His tuberculosis relapsed under the prison's conditions.

Makhno received support from the European anarchist movement. Polish and Bulgarian anarchists even threatened violence in the event of Makhno's extradition. At their five-day trial in November 1923, Makhno and Halyna were acquitted on all charges and given residence permits for Poznań. The following month he and his family moved to Toruń, where he was under close police surveillance and arrested and interrogated a number of times in the wake of Vladimir Lenin's death. Unable to secure a visa to travel to Germany and facing a severe strain on his marriage with Halyna, Makhno attempted suicide in April 1924 and was hospitalized by his injuries.

In July 1924, Makhno and his family were allowed to move to the Free City of Danzig. Here, Makhno was swiftly arrested by the Danzig authorities for visa violations. While interned he was struck again by tuberculosis and transferred to a prison hospital. Makhno's anarchist comrades helped him escape the hospital and, after a time in hiding, clandestinely leave for Berlin. He finally moved to Paris in April 1925.

Paris 

Upon his arrival in Paris in April 1925, Makhno wrote that he had found himself "amongst a foreign people and political enemies whom I have so often declaimed against." He was reunited with his wife and daughter in the city, where French anarchists like May Picqueray provided the family with lodging and healthcare. Makhno found work at a local foundry and a Renault factory, but was forced to leave both jobs due to his health problems. A bullet wound in his right ankle threatened amputation. His health care was overseen by the anarcha-feminist Lucile Pelletier, who described his body as being "literally encased in scar tissue". She advised his family to move out to prevent them from contracting tuberculosis. Between his debilitating illness, homesickness and a strong language barrier, Makhno fell into a deep depression. According to Alexander Berkman, Makhno particularly despised living in a big city and dreamed of returning to the Ukrainian countryside, where he could "tak[e] up again the struggle for liberty and social justice."

Makhno undertook to write his Memoirs, which sold poorly. He also collaborated with exiled Russian anarchists to establish the bimonthly libertarian communist journal Delo Truda, in which Makhno published an article in each issue over three years. Arshinov, the journal's editor, criticized Makhno's articles as poorly written, which upset Makhno greatly and exacerbated his resentment of those anarchists who he considered to be "armchair theoreticians". The theoretical developments of the journal eventually culminated in the publication of the Organizational Platform of the Libertarian Communists, which called for the reorganization of the anarchist movement into a more cohesive structure, based on the experiences of revolutionary Ukraine and the defeat by the Bolsheviks. The Platform attracted criticism from the synthesists, such as Volin, who regarded it as a Bolshevization of anarchism. A March 1927 meeting to discuss the Platform in L'Haÿ-les-Roses attracted anarchists from Russia, Poland, Bulgaria, Italy, and China. When the meeting was raided by police, Makhno was arrested and threatened with deportation, but he was defended by Louis Lecoin and Henri Sellier, who secured his continued stay in France.

During this period, he often met with anarchist friends in cafes and restaurants, reminiscing over a bottle of wine about the "good old days" in Ukraine, one time even celebrating the fall from power of his old rival Leon Trotsky and hoping that the fall of Joseph Stalin would soon follow. In June 1926, during a meal with Alexander Berkman and May Picqueray in a Russian restaurant, Makhno met with the Ukrainian Jewish anarchist Sholem Schwarzbard, who went pale upon seeing the Ukrainian nationalist leader Symon Petliura walk into the room. Schwarzbard immediately informed the Batko of his intentions to assassinate Petliura, in revenge for the pogroms carried out in the Ukrainian People's Republic, during which some of his family members had been killed. Makhno attempted to dissuade him but the deed was carried out anyway, with Schwarzbard's subsequent trial bringing to light a trove of documentary evidence on the pogroms in Ukraine, exonerating the assassin.

Around this time, rumors began to circulate about Makhno's own relationship to antisemitism, resulting in public debates on the matter. Citing stories of Makhno told by White émigrés, Joseph Kessel published a novel that portrayed a fictionalized version of Makhno as an Orthodox Christian and antisemite, an accusation which Makhno categorically denied. Makhno defended himself by speaking up about the pogroms in Ukraine: in To the Jews of all Countries, published in Delo Truda, he asked for evidence of antisemitism in the Makhnovist ranks; at an open debate in June 1927, Makhno claimed that he had defended Ukrainian Jews from persecution, an assertion that was backed up by Russian and Ukrainian Jews in attendance. During his time in Ukraine, Makhno had condemned and severely punished cases of antisemitism within the Makhnovist ranks, even having ordered the execution of Makhnovists that had participated in a pogrom against the Jewish settlement at Gorkaya and redistributed weapons to the Jewish community for their own protection. According to Volin, investigations by the Jewish historian Elias Tcherikower had found no evidence of Makhno himself having perpetrated antisemitic violence. Allegations of antisemitism were later also disputed by historians and some of Makhno's biographers, including Paul Avrich, Peter Kenez, Michael Malet and Alexandre Skirda. 

By this time, Makhno was succumbing to physical and mental illness. His relationships with fellow Ukrainian exiles deteriorated. His wife grew to resent him, causing the couple to separate on multiple occasions, with Halyna even unsuccessfully attempting to apply for permission to return to Soviet Ukraine. Over the editing of his memoirs, Makhno quarreled with Ida Mett, who quit out of frustration with Makhno's "indecipherable and meandering manuscripts". He also came into a serious personal and political conflict with Volin, which would last until their deaths, resulting in the later volumes of Makhno's memoirs only being published posthumously. As gossip spread about Makhno, he became increasingly defensive against any criticisms of himself, no matter how minor. In the pages of Delo Truda, he published categorical denials of anything from allegations of antisemitism to whether the Makhnovists had used a flag that carried a skull and crossbones.

Alienated from many of the Russian and French anarchists in Paris, Makhno turned his attention towards Spain. Following the release of Spanish anarchists from prison, Makhno met with Francisco Ascaso and Buenaventura Durruti in July 1927. The Spaniards expressed their admiration for Makhno, who himself displayed a sense of optimism about the Spanish anarchist movement and foretold of a coming anarchist revolution in Spain. Makhno was particularly impressed by the revolutionary traditions of the Spanish working classes and the tight organization of the Spanish anarchists, declaring that if a revolution broke out in Spain before he died, then he would join the fight. 

Due to the threats of deportation, he mostly kept to his writing, as he was no longer able to attend meetings or engage in active organizing. In great pain, increasingly isolated and financially precarious, Makhno got odd jobs as an interior decorator and shoemaker. He was also supported by the income of his wife, who worked as a cleaner, and in April 1929, May Picqueray and other French anarchists established a "Makhno Solidarity Committee" to raise funds. Much of the money was contributed by the Spanish anarchists of the Confederación Nacional del Trabajo (CNT), which greatly admired Makhno, with the fundraiser in Le Libertaire eventually securing Makhno's family a weekly allowance of 250 francs, barely one-third of the living wage. Makhno spent most of this money on his daughter, neglecting his own self-care, which contributed further to his declining health. His ideological conflict with the synthesis anarchists escalated and, in July 1930, Le Libertaire suspended his allowance. Individual fundraising attempts ended up being unsuccessful.

Around this time, Makhno learned that Peter Arshinov had defected to the Soviet Union, which left him even more isolated from the Ukrainian exiles. Makhno spent his last years writing criticisms of the Bolsheviks and encouraging other anarchists to learn from the mistakes of the Ukrainian experience. His final article, an obituary for his old friend Nikolai Rogdaev, went unsent as Makhno could not afford the postage. As he suffered from malnutrition, Makhno's tuberculosis worsened to the point that he was hospitalized on 16 March 1934. Operations failed to help and Makhno finally died in the early hours of 25 July 1934. He was cremated three days after his death, with five hundred people attending his funeral at the Père Lachaise Cemetery in Paris.

Personal life

While imprisoned in the 1910s, Makhno received "warm letters" from one Nastia Vasetskaia, a young peasant woman from Huliaipole. After his return home in 1917, the two met and became a couple, living together on a commune where Makhno contributed. His activism during this time, however, left him "little time for personal affairs". Vasetskaia was eventually forced to flee Huliaipole after being threatened by Black Guards, taking their child with her. After Makhno himself was forced into exile by the invasion of the Central Powers in early 1918, Makhno managed to reunite with Vasetskaia in Tsaritsyn, finding her lodging at a nearby farm. Makhno soon left her to continue his travels. They never saw each other again. Their baby died young and, after hearing a rumor that Makhno had also died, Vasetskaia found another partner.

Following the Makhnovist capture of Huliaipole from the Central Powers in late 1918, Makhno met a local schoolteacher called Halyna Kuzmenko, who became his wife and a leading figure in the Makhnovshchina. With the defeat of the Makhnovshchina, the couple fled to Romania and then on to Poland, where Kuzmenko gave birth to their daughter Elena while she and Makhno were both in prison. The family finally settled in Paris but were forced to live separately for some time due to Makhno's worsening tuberculosis.

Years after Makhno's death, Volin described Makhno's "greatest failing" as being alcohol abuse, claiming that "under the influence of alcohol, he became perverse, over-excitable, unfair, intractable and violent." These claims of alcoholism were disputed by Ida Mett and Makhno's biographer Alexandre Skirda, who respectively noted Makhno's low alcohol tolerance and his enforcement of prohibition during the war. Although other biographers, such as Michael Malet and Victor Peters, wrote that Makhno began to drink heavily during the final years of his life, "when he knew that the tuberculosis was killing him anyway."

Makhno's widow and his daughter Elena were deported to Nazi Germany for forced labor during World War II. After the end of the war they were arrested by the Soviet NKVD and taken to Kyiv for trial in 1946. For the crime of "anti-Soviet agitation", Halyna was sentenced to eight years of hard labor in Mordovia and Elena was sentenced to five years in Kazakhstan. Following the death of Stalin, the two were reunited in Taraz, where they spent the rest of their lives: Halyna would die in 1978, followed by Elena in 1993. Makhno's relatives in Huliaipole faced harassment by Ukrainian authorities up until the dissolution of the Soviet Union.

Legacy
The Ukrainian anarchist insurgency continued after Makhno's 1921 flight to Romania. Makhnovist militant groups operated clandestinely throughout the 1920s. Some continued to fight as partisans during World War II. Although the Soviets eventually extinguished the Ukrainian anarchist movement, an anarchist underground continued during the 1970s and following the Revolutions of 1989. Various anarchist groups draw on the name of Makhno for inspiration. The anti-fascist militants of Revolutionary Action have also lain claim to Makhno's legacy and "neo-Makhnovist" sympathies emerged from the anarchists that participated in the Revolution of Dignity.

Makhno is a local hero in his hometown of Huliaipole, where a statue of the Bat'ko stands in its main town square. The Huliaipole Local History Museum hosts a permanent exhibition dedicated to Makhno. In the late 2010s, the Huliaipole City Council was preparing to request the return of Makhno's ashes from France, as part of a campaign to attract tourists to the city, declaring Makhno to be part of the city's brand. Since the dissolution of the Soviet Union, sections of the Ukrainian far right have also attempted to reclaim Makhno as a Ukrainian nationalist and to downplay his anarchist politics.

Multiple Soviet and Russian films depicted Makhno, often in a negative light. Makno was the antagonist in the 1923 Red Devils, portrayed by the Odesa gangster and part-time actor Vladimir Kucherenko. He reprised his role in the 1926 sequel Savur-Mohyla and returned to crime by using the name "Makhno" as a pseudonym. Boris Chirkov portrayed Makhno in the 1942 epic film Alexander Parkhomenko in which he famously sang the traditional Cossack song "Lovely, brothers, lovely" while drinking vodka. Valeri Zolotukhin played Makhno in the 1970 drama Hail, Mary!, about a Makhnovist who works as a Red Army informant. Aleksey Tolstoy's novel trilogy The Road to Calvary portrays Makhno as a dangerous deformation of the revolution with a corrupting influence on the morally unstable.

The 2005 Nine Lives of Nestor Makhno was a Russian biographical miniseries about Nestor Makhno's life. Pavel Derevyanko portrayed Makhno, and Russian critics gave his performance high praise. The series was noted for its positive portrayal of Makhno, although some reviewers also criticised the series for lacking narrative coherence. Hélène Châtelain directed a 1995 French documentary about Makhno.

Also, Makhno has been referenced in popular media as a cultural allusion, such as a supporting role in Michael Moorcock's 1981 alternative history novel The Steel Tsar, the opening track in the Russian rock band Lyube's 1989 album  during the fall of communism in the Eastern Bloc, a song U.S. representative Dana Rohrabacher had written and played for the 1991 official visit of a People's Deputy of Ukraine, and the pseudonym used by the leader of an "anti-yuppie crusade" in San Francisco against perceived gentrification by Silicon Valley.

Following the 2022 Russian invasion of Ukraine, the legacy of Nestor Makhno and the Makhnovshchina was again taken up by Ukrainian anti-authoritarians that joined the Territorial Defense Forces (TDF). Symbols of the Makhnovshchina have appeared in the propaganda of the Resistance Committee, an anarchist detachment in the TDF, on the patches of a Ukrainian armed unit of green anarchists, and on flags flown on the back of modern-day tachankas. The Ukrainian Armed Forces also adopted the name "Makhno's bow" for their defense forces engaged in the battle of Huliaipole, which has occupied a key place in the line of contact between Ukrainian and Russian-occupied Zaporizhzhia. A museum exhibition on Makhno was damaged during the Russian shelling of Huliaipole, while his statue in the town centre is covered with sandbags in order to protect it.

See also

Notes

References

Bibliography

Further reading 

 
 
 
 
 
 
 
 
 
 
 
 
 
 
 
 
 
 
 
 
 
 
 
 
Letter Exchange on above article 
 (a response to the above article)

External links 

 The Nestor Makhno Archive
 Works by and about Nestor Makhno at The Anarchist Library
 Works by and about Nestor Makhno at Libcom.org
 

  

1888 births
1934 deaths
19th-century atheists
19th-century Ukrainian people
20th-century atheists
20th-century Ukrainian people
20th-century deaths from tuberculosis
Anarchist partisans
Anarchist theorists
Anarcho-communists
Anti-imperialism
Anti-monarchists
Anti-Stalinist left
Burials at Père Lachaise Cemetery
Carpenters
Community activists
Former Russian Orthodox Christians
Guerrilla warfare theorists
Insurrectionary anarchists
Makhnovshchina
People from Alexandrovsky Uyezd (Yekaterinoslav Governorate)
People from Huliaipole
People of Cossack descent
People of the Russian Civil War
People of the Russian Revolution
Prisoners and detainees of Poland
Prisoners and detainees of Russia
Prisoners sentenced to life imprisonment by Russia
Social anarchists
Soviet anarchists
Soviet emigrants to France
Soviet emigrants to Romania
Soviet emigrants to Poland
Soviet military personnel of the Russian Civil War
Soviet people of the Ukrainian–Soviet War
Tuberculosis deaths in France
Ukrainian agrarianists
Ukrainian anarchists
Ukrainian atheists
Ukrainian anti-capitalists
Ukrainian communists
Ukrainian Cossacks
Ukrainian dissidents
Ukrainian emigrants to France
Ukrainian emigrants to Romania
Ukrainian guerrillas
Ukrainian male writers
Ukrainian military leaders
Ukrainian people imprisoned abroad
Ukrainian people of the Ukrainian–Soviet War
Ukrainian prisoners and detainees
Ukrainian rebels
Ukrainian refugees
Ukrainian revolutionaries
Ukrainian socialists
Ukrainian trade unionists
Ukrainian writers in Russian
Wartime cross-dressers